KYQX (89.3 FM) is a community radio station licensed to Weatherford, Texas. The station serves the area around Weatherford, Mineral Wells, and the western DFW metro area. KYQX airs a classic country format calling itself Pure Country. KYQX is also rebroadcast on 89.5 KEQX from Stephenville TX which originally played the music. Until mid 2017 KYQX broadcast on 89.5 FM, before it reduced power and changed frequencies to make way for KEQX's upgrade. The station is one of the three stations in the QXFM group of stations. The others are KMQX, and KEQX.

External links

 DFW Radio/TV History

YQX
Radio stations established in 1986
1986 establishments in Texas